Shah Babak (also Romanized as Shah Bābak and Shāh Bābak; also known as Shāh Bāvegh) is a village in Jakdan Rural District, in the Central District of Bashagard County, Hormozgan Province, Iran. At the 2006 census, its population was 448, in 114 families.

References 

Populated places in Bashagard County